Mr. Dynamite may refer to:

Film and television
 Mister Dynamite, a 1935 American action film
 Mr. Dynamite (film), a 1941 American crime film
 Mr. Dynamite, a 1947 Bollywood film
 Mr. Dynamite: The Rise of James Brown, a 2014 HBO documentary directed by Alex Gibney

Music
 "Mr. Dynamite", a nickname of American singer James Brown
 Mr. Dynamite, a 1963 album by Swedish singer Jerry Williams
 "Mr. Dynamite", a song by Iggy Pop from the 1980 album Soldier
 "Mr. Dynamite", a 1999 song by Japanese singer Zeebra

See also
 Ms. Dynamite (born 1981), English hip hop and R&B recording artist